Dance-pop is a popular music subgenre that originated in the late 1970s to early 1980s. It is generally uptempo music intended for nightclubs with the intention of being danceable but also suitable for contemporary hit radio. Developing from a combination of dance and pop with influences of disco, post-disco and synth-pop, it is generally characterised by strong beats with easy, uncomplicated song structures which are generally more similar to pop music than the more free-form dance genre, with an emphasis on melody as well as catchy tunes. The genre, on the whole, tends to be producer-driven, despite some notable exceptions.

Dance-pop is highly eclectic, having borrowed influences from other genres, which varied by producers, artists and periods. Such include contemporary R&B, house, trance, techno, electropop, new jack swing, funk and pop rock.

Dance-pop is a popular mainstream style of music and there have been numerous artists and groups who perform in the genre. Notable artists include Cher, Madonna, Britney Spears, Rick Astley, Kylie Minogue, Christina Aguilera, Spice Girls, Paula Abdul, Backstreet Boys, Michael Jackson, NSYNC, Jennifer Lopez, Janet Jackson, Rihanna, Katy Perry, Lady Gaga, Years & Years, Justin Bieber, and Ava Max, among others.

History

1980s

As the term "disco" started to go out of fashion by the late 1970s to early 1980s, other terms were commonly used to describe disco-based music, such as "post-disco", "club", "dance" or "dance-pop" music. These genres were, in essence, a more modern variant of disco music known as post-disco, which tended to be more experimental, electronic and producer/DJ-driven, often using sequencers and synthesizers.

Dance-pop music emerged around the early 1980s as a combination of dance and pop, or post-disco, which was uptempo and simple, club-natured, producer-driven and catchy. Dance-pop was more uptempo and dancey than regular pop, yet more structured and less free-form than dance music, usually combining pop's easy structure and catchy tunes with dance's strong beat and uptempo nature. Dance-pop music was usually created, composed and produced by record producers who would then hire singers to perform the songs.

At the beginning of the 1980s, disco was an anathema to mainstream pop. According to prominent Allmusic critic Stephen Thomas Erlewine, Madonna had a huge role in popularizing dance music as mainstream music, utilizing her charisma, chutzpah and sex appeal. Erlewine claimed that Madonna "launched dance-pop" and set the standard for the genre for the next two decades. As the primary songwriter on her self-titled debut album and a co-producer by her third record, Madonna's insistence on being involved in all creative aspects of her work was highly unusual for a female dance-pop vocalist at the time. The staff of Vice magazine stated that her debut album "drew the blueprint for future dance-pop."

In the 1980s, dance-pop was closely aligned to other uptempo electronic genres, such as Hi-NRG. Prominent producers in the 1980s included Stock, Aitken and Waterman, who created Hi-NRG/dance-pop for artists such as Kylie Minogue, Dead or Alive and Bananarama. During the decade, dance-pop borrowed influences from funk (e.g. Michael Jackson and Whitney Houston), new jack swing (e.g. Janet Jackson and Paula Abdul), and contemporary R&B.

Other prominent dance-pop artists and groups of the 1980s included the Pet Shop Boys, Mel and Kim, Samantha Fox, Debbie Gibson, and Tiffany.

1990s
By the 1990s, dance-pop had become a major genre in popular music. Several dance-pop groups and artists emerged during the 1990s, such as the Spice Girls, Britney Spears, Christina Aguilera, Jessica Simpson, Backstreet Boys, and 'NSYNC. During the early 1990s, dance-pop borrowed influences from house music (e.g. Right Said Fred's "I'm Too Sexy", Taylor Dayne's Soul Dancing, and Madonna's "Vogue", "Rescue Me" and "Deeper and Deeper"), as well as contemporary R&B and new jack swing (e.g. Shanice's "I Love Your Smile").

By the late 1990s, electronic influences became evident in dance-pop music; Madonna's critically acclaimed and commercially successful album Ray of Light (1998) incorporated techno, trance and other forms of electronic dance music, bringing electronica into mainstream dance-pop. Additionally, also in 1998, Cher released a dance-pop song called "Believe" which made usage of a technological innovation of the time, Auto-Tune. An audio processor and a form of pitch modification software, Auto-Tune is commonly used as a way to correct pitch and to create special effects. Since the late 1990s, the use of Auto-Tune processing has become a common feature of dance-pop music.

Celine Dion also released a midtempo dance-pop song, "That's the Way It Is" by the end of 1999. Also during this period, some British bands connected with Britpop and alternative pop experimented with dance-pop as a form - examples include Catatonia single "Karaoke Queen," Bis's top 40 hit "Eurodisco", Kenickie's final single "Stay in the Sun" and Romo band Orlando's major-label debut single "Just For A Second." Another Britpop band, Theaudience was fronted by Sophie Ellis Bextor who went on to a successful solo career primarily in artist-driven dance-pop.

2000s

At the beginning of the 2000s, dance-pop music was still prominent, and highly electronic in style, influenced by genres such as trance, house, techno and electro. Nonetheless, as R&B and hip hop became extremely popular from the early part of the decade onwards, dance-pop was often influenced by urban music. Dance-pop stars from the 1980s and 1990s such as Britney Spears, Christina Aguilera, Madonna, Janet Jackson and Kylie Minogue continued to achieve success at the beginning of the decade. Whilst much dance-pop at the time was R&B-influenced, many records started to return to their disco roots; Kylie Minogue's albums such as Light Years (2000) and Fever (2001) contained influences of disco music, or a new 21st-century version of the genre known as nu-disco; hit singles such as "Spinning Around" (2000) and "Can't Get You Out of My Head" (2001) also contained disco traces. In Madonna's case, her album Music (2000) contained elements of Euro disco, especially the successful eponymous lead single.

Nevertheless, it was not until the mid-to-latter part of the decade when dance-pop music returned greatly to its disco roots; this can be seen with Madonna's album Confessions on a Dance Floor (2005), which borrowed strong influences from the genre, especially from 1970s artists and bands such as ABBA, Giorgio Moroder, the Bee Gees and Donna Summer. Britney Spears' album Blackout (2007) contained influences of Euro disco.

The mid-to-late 2000s saw the arrival of several new dance-pop artists, including Rihanna, Kesha, Katy Perry and Lady Gaga. This period in time also saw dance-pop's return to its more electronic roots aside from its disco ones, with strong influences of synthpop and electropop. Lady Gaga is frequently considered one of the pioneers of this evolution, notably with her singles "Just Dance" and "Poker Face" which were heavily influenced by synthpop and electropop. Rihanna's singles in the dance-pop genre, including "Don't Stop the Music" and "Disturbia", contained electronic influences, the former of which has elements of house music, the latter electropop. Kesha's debut single, "Tik Tok", was also highly electronic in style and employed a video game beat. Katy Perry's "Hot N Cold" (2008), "California Gurls" (2010), and "Firework" (2010), which were major commercial hits, also showcased influences of electropop and house music.

2010s
The 2010s, similarly to the late 2000s, saw strong electronic influences present within dance-pop and also strong emphasis on bass-heavy drum beats. Artists such as Britney Spears, Lady Gaga, Taylor Swift, Katy Perry, Madonna, Kesha, Christina Aguilera, Usher and Rihanna remained very popular, while newer recording artists such as Ariana Grande, Justin Bieber, Rita Ora, and Dua Lipa joined the dance-pop charts within the decade.

American singer-songwriter Taylor Swift's albums Red (2012), 1989 (2014) and Reputation (2017) contain more of a pop-influenced sound, which features production by dance-pop record producers Max Martin and Shellback. Ariana Grande's single "Problem" featuring Iggy Azalea was a big hit in 2014 and reached combined sales and track-equivalent streams of 9 million units worldwide the following year.

Characteristics
Dance-pop generally contains several notable characteristics:

Uptempo, upbeat music intended for clubs, with a danceable or dance-centered character.
Catchy songs with an easy, pop-based structure.
A strong emphasis on beats, grooves and rhythms.
Prominent hooks.
Simple lyrics.
Polished productions.

See also
 List of dance-pop artists

References

Print sources

 
20th-century dance
21st-century dance
1980s in music
1990s in music
2000s in music
2010s in music
Dance in the United States
Dance music genres
Pop music genres
Post-disco
Fusion music genres